Iliya Kirchev (28 December 1932 – 11 September 1997) was a Bulgarian footballer.

Career
Kirchev was a central defender. He played with PFC Spartak Varna and earned 286 caps in Bulgarian first division. For the Bulgaria national football team Kirchev featured in 7 games and won a bronze medal at the 1956 Summer Olympics. He died at the age of 64 in 1997.

Honours

International
Bulgaria
Olympic Bronze Medal: 1956

References

External links
 Spartak Varna profile 
 
 

1932 births
1997 deaths
Bulgarian footballers
Bulgaria international footballers
PFC Spartak Varna players
First Professional Football League (Bulgaria) players
Footballers at the 1956 Summer Olympics
Footballers at the 1960 Summer Olympics
Olympic footballers of Bulgaria
Olympic bronze medalists for Bulgaria
Bulgarian football managers
PFC Spartak Varna managers
People from Varna Province
Medalists at the 1956 Summer Olympics
Association football defenders
Sportspeople from Varna, Bulgaria